is a Mega Man fighting game developed and published by Capcom for the Neo Geo Pocket Color handheld system in 2000. It is a portable version of the two arcade fighting games Mega Man: The Power Battle, and Mega Man 2: The Power Fighters. The game involves choosing one of four characters and fighting through a series of boss battles. The game was originally only released in Japan, but was localized in 2022 as Mega Man Battle & Fighters for the Nintendo Switch.

Gameplay
Rockman Battle & Fighters is a fighting game similar to the two arcade titles Mega Man: The Power Battle, and Mega Man 2: The Power Fighters. Playing as one of four characters (Mega Man, Proto Man, Bass, and Duo), the player chooses between three sets of boss battles with various Robot Masters from the series. The battles are fought linearly in any order, and after each boss is defeated, a special weapon is added to the player's arsenal. Each boss is weak to one specific weapon, so the player is encouraged to strategize the order in which the bosses are faced. Two players can use a link cable to transfer database information between systems, but no co-op or versus play is supported.

Reception

Critical reception for Rockman Battle & Fighters has been mixed. Tim Torres of 2D-X called the game "tightly designed and wonderfully animated", and summarizing it as "way better than it has any right to be". Colin Williamson of IGN stated, "I really enjoyed this one. Boss encounters have always been one of the big perks of the Mega Man series, and porting over not one, but two arcade games in the same package was a stroke of good fortune. I wish there was a little more to do with the link cable, but this is a fine little action game for one of the best 'dead' portable game systems out there." Jeremy Parish of 1UP.com did not recommend the game, but found it to be "a fun (and cute) portable diversion".

In 2023, Time Extension identified Rockman Battle & Fighters as one of the best games for the NGPC.

References

External links
Official website 
Rockman Battle & Fighters can be played for free in the browser on the Internet Archive 

2000 video games
Fighting games
Neo Geo Pocket Color games
Nintendo Switch games
Multiplayer and single-player video games
Video games developed in Japan
Mega Man spin-off games